Dinara Assembly constituency is an assembly constituency for Bihar Legislative Assembly in Rohtas district. It comes under Buxar (Lok Sabha constituency).

Members of Legislative Assembly

Election results

2020 results

References

External links
 

Assembly constituencies of Bihar